Halton, formerly a separate village, is now part of the town of Runcorn, Cheshire, England.  The name Halton has been assumed by the Borough of Halton, which includes Runcorn, Widnes and some outlying parishes.

History

There is evidence of human occupation in the Stone Age and during the Roman era. The village is recorded in the Domesday Book (1086) in the hundred of Tunendune and towards the end of the 11th century the first castle, which became the seat of the Barons of Halton, was built on the hill. The Tunendune hundred court was absorbed into Bucklow hundred by 1260 so government statistics for Halton over many later centuries are indexed by Bucklow hundred.

During the medieval period a deer park measuring  lay to the south and the west of the village.  At this time Halton had a weekly market and annual fair.  The village held a court leet and the castle was used as a prison.  During the Civil War the castle was held by the Royalists and twice besieged by Parliamentary forces.  Following this the castle fell into ruin.  The importance of Halton declined with the coming of the Industrial Revolution and the development of the chemical and other industries in Runcorn.

Geography
On the summit of the outcrop are the ruins of Halton Castle. The major road, Main Street, passes below the castle, to its west and south, and Castle Road leads up to the castle.

Demography
Population statistics were recorded separately for the parish of Halton until the village was incorporated into its larger neighbour under the Runcorn New Town (Designation) Order 1964.

The population of Halton Village in 1664 has been estimated as 375.

Today

The village is now entirely residential.  It is surrounded to the west and north by the estates of Runcorn New Town.  To the south is Halton Lea, a shopping mall, and other retail and entertainment outlets.  To the east is Town Park.  The castle is a Grade I listed building and a scheduled ancient monument, and there are a number of other listed buildings in the village.  There are two public houses, the Castle Hotel, which is incorporated into the structure of the castle and which contains the former courthouse, and the Norton Arms.  In the village are two active churches, the Anglican Church of St Mary and Trinity Methodist Church.
The Village has a Millennium Green, one of a series of 245 charity-run public Greenspaces created at the Turn of the Millennium.

See also

Listed buildings in Runcorn (urban area)

References

Notes

Bibliography

Villages in Cheshire
Runcorn